Charles Hutchison (December 3, 1879 – May 30, 1949) was an American film actor, director and screenwriter. He appeared in more than 40 films between 1914 and 1944. He also directed 33 films between 1915 and 1938. Though he directed numerous independent silent features, he is best remembered today as Pathé's leading male serial star from 1918 to 1922. In 1923 he went to Britain and made two films Hutch Stirs 'em Up and Hurricane Hutch in Many Adventures for the Ideal Film Company. He made one last serial in 1926, Lightning Hutch, for distribution by the Arrow Film Corporation. It was meant to be a comeback vehicle, but the production company went into bankruptcy just as it was released.

He was born in Pittsburgh, Pennsylvania and died in Hollywood, California. He was the person who convinced actor Karl Dane to return to films in the mid-1920s.

Serials of Charles Hutchison

 Wolves of Kultur (1918)
 The Great Gamble (1919)
 The Whirlwind (1920)
 Double Adventure (1921)
 Hurricane Hutch (1921)
 Go Get 'Em Hutch (1922)
 Speed (1922)
 Hutch Stirs 'em Up (1923)
 Hurricane Hutch in Many Adventures (1924)
 Was It Bigamy? (1925)
 Lightning Hutch (1926)

Selected filmography
Actor
 The Better Woman (1915)
 War Brides (1916)
 The Golden God (1917)
 Hutch Stirs 'em Up (1923)
 Hurricane Hutch in Many Adventures (1924)
 Turned Up (1924)
 The Hidden Menace (1925) 
 Pirates of the Sky (1926)
 The Trunk Mystery (1926)
 Hidden Aces (1927)

Director
 On Probation (1924)
 Hurricane Hutch in Many Adventures (1924)
 The Hidden Menace (1925) 
 The Winning Wallop (1926)
 The Smoke Eaters (1926)
 The Little Firebrand (1926)
 Flying High (1926)
 The Down Grade (1927)
 When Danger Calls (1927)
Catch-As-Catch-Can (1927)
 Bitter Sweets (1928)
 Out with the Tide (1928)
 Found Alive (1933)
 The Judgement Book (1935)
 On Probation (1935)
 Desert Guns (1936)
 Phantom Patrol (1936)
 Born to Fight (1936)

References

External links

Charles Hutchison at Virtual History

1879 births
1949 deaths
American male film actors
American male silent film actors
American film directors
American male screenwriters
20th-century American male actors
Male actors from Pittsburgh
Screenwriters from Pennsylvania
20th-century American male writers
20th-century American screenwriters